Caro Meldrum-Hanna is an Australian investigative journalist.

Meldrum-Hanna is best known for her work with ABC Television's Four Corners program.

Among Meldrum-Hanna's stories on Four Corners, two notable reports are an investigation into the treatment of juveniles at the Don Dale Youth Detention Centre entitled "Australia's Shame" and an investigation into a greyhound racing live baiting scandal entitled "Making a Killing".

For "Making a Killing", Meldrum-Hanna was the co-recipient of the 2015 Gold Walkley, shared with producer Sam Clark and researcher Max Murch.

Also in 2015, she won Journalist of the Year at the Kennedy Awards.

Meldrum-Hanna is also known for a three-part ABC documentary which aired in 2018, Exposed: The Case of Keli Lane, which explored the case of waterpolo player Keli Lane, who was convicted of murdering her newborn daughter in 1996.

In 2015, Meldrum-Hanna spoke of the tribulations of being a female journalist covering sporting issues, recalling an alleged incident in which two male radio presenters in Adelaide insinuated during a live interview that she must have had a sexual relationship with sports scientist Stephen Dank for him to have granted her an interview during the Essendon Football Club supplements saga when he had refused other interview requests.   According to Meldrum-Hanna, an apology was offered which she refused.

Meldrum-Hanna is a graduate of the University of Technology Sydney.

References 

21st-century Australian journalists
Australian women journalists
Australian investigative journalists
Australian television journalists
Year of birth missing (living people)
Living people